Elizabeth Bryan is an Australian executive.

Elizabeth Bryan may also refer to:

Elizabeth Carew (née Bryan) (c. 1500–1546), English courtier and reputed mistress of King Henry VIII
Elizabeth M. Bryan (1942–2008), English paediatrician

See also
Betsy Bryan (born 1949), American Egyptologist